Soft Sounds from Another Planet is the second studio album by American indie pop band Japanese Breakfast. The album was released by Dead Oceans on July 14, 2017.

Primarily described as an indie rock and shoegaze album, Soft Sounds from Another Planet also incorporates elements of electronic dance music, synth-pop, space pop, electropop, lo-fi, progressive rock, experimental pop and chamber pop. It primarily deals with themes of loss, science fiction and perseverance.

Background 
In 2014, Michelle Zauner left the Philadelphia-based emo band Little Big League to care for her terminally ill mother in her hometown of Eugene, Oregon. Songs she wrote to cope with her grief about her mother's death became part of Psychopomp (2016), Japanese Breakfast's debut studio album. Psychopomp received unexpected critical and commercial success, rejuvenating Zauner's efforts to make music a career, but she found herself "reliving traumatic memories" when giving interviews about the album. She said she began writing Soft Sounds from Another Planet to help leave her trauma behind.

Zauner envisioned it as a concept album, a "sci fi musical" that would tackle different themes than its predecessor. The first song she wrote for the new album was "Machinist." She found that she disliked the songs she was creating at the time.

Release and promotion

Singles 
On May 4, 2017, Japanese Breakfast released the album's lead single, "Machinist" to positive critical reviews. It debuted alongside a music video depicting a woman who dismantles her spaceship when she tries to build a body for her robot lover. The video was directed by Zauner and Adam Kolodny. A second single, "Boyish", was released on June 7, 2017, followed by its own video on February 13, 2018, which Zauner later described as her "magnum opus". A third and final single, "Road Head", was released on July 6, 2017, alongside another music video directed by Zauner, who drew inspiration from Hong Kong film director Wong Kar-wai's film Fallen Angels and television series Twin Peaks.

Video game 
To promote the album, Japanese Breakfast released a video game, "Japanese BreakQuest". Players guide "J-Brekkie", a character named for the band's Twitter handle, to gather a band and fight an alien invasion. It was developed by Zauner and video game developer Elaine Fath and features songs from the album as 8-bit MIDI tracks by Peter Bradley.

Critical reception

Soft Sounds from Another Planet received a weighted score of 83 out of 100 from review aggregate website Metacritic, indicating "universal acclaim", based on 20 reviews from music critics. Nathan Reese of Pitchfork wrote, "Inspired by the cosmos, Japanese Breakfast's Michelle Zauner addresses life on Earth. Her voice shines over melancholic arrangements, evoking Pacific Northwest indie rock as much as shoegaze." Tim Sendra of AllMusic wrote, "Much slicker and less wonky (than Psychopomp), the songs have a spacious, expansive sound that envelops the listener in warmth (even when the synths get a little chilly.)" Brian Shultz of The A.V. Club said, "And while everything on Japanese Breakfast's proper sophomore effort isn't entirely fresh, and its structure is somewhat loose, there's a confidence and crispness to Soft Sounds that shows just how fully realized Zauner's formerly homemade experiments have become." Exclaim!s Ian Gormely wrote, "In trying to put a wall between herself and her audience, she's opened a new, far more revealing side to her music and herself."

Accolades

Track listing

Personnel
Adapted from AllMusic.
 David Bartler – saxophone
 Asher Brooks – trumpet
 Jorge Elbrecht – mixing
 David Hartley – engineer
 Craig Hendrix – engineer, producer
 Michael Johnson – engineer
 Heba Kadry – mastering
 Craig Scheihing – photography
 Todd Schied – engineer
 Nathaniel David Utesch – design
 Michelle Zauner – vocals, guitars, producer

Charts

References

2017 albums
Dead Oceans albums
Japanese Breakfast albums